Havana Winter is the fourth album by Kevin Hearn and Thin Buckle. It was released on July 30, 2009. Kevin Hearn wrote all of the tracks on the album, which was produced by Hearn and Michael Phillip Wojewoda. It was packaged in a double-fold digipak, with no booklet or liner notes.

Guests on the album include Lou Reed, Mary Margaret O'Hara, Chantal Kreviazuk, John McDermott and Laurie Anderson.

Reception 
PopMatters wrote, "[H]is songs have almost surprising depth at times. They're light, and they don't force; they don't come to you. You go to them with a nugget of curiosity, and then you realize they're not as light as you think."

Track listing

Personnel
Kevin Hearn and Thinbuckle
Kevin Hearn - Vocals, piano, keyboards, guitar, lead guitar on 7
Chris Gartner - Bass, backing vocals
Brian Macmillan - Slide guitar, backing vocals, synthesizer on 2
Bob Scott - Drums
Mike Rathke - Electric guitar, lead guitar on 2

Additional personnel
Mike Olsen - Cello on 2
Chantal Kreviazuk - Vocals on 1, 2, and 4
John MacDermott - Vocals on 6
Lou Reed - Lead guitar on 1, moog guitar on 6 and 7
Laurie Anderson - Violin on 3
Mary Margaret O'Hara - Vocals on 3
Richard Underhill - Saxophones on 5
Tony Thunder Smith - Vocal on 6

Production
Producers: Kevin Hearn, Michael Phillip Wojewoda
Mixing: Michael Phillip Wojewoda, Eric Kramer
Digital Editing: Kenny Luong
Mastering: Ted Jensen

References 

2009 albums
Kevin Hearn and Thin Buckle albums
Albums produced by Michael Phillip Wojewoda